Worzel Gummidge is a  scarecrow in British children's fiction, who originally appeared in a series of books by the English novelist Barbara Euphan Todd. It was the first story book published by Puffin Books.

The books have been adapted for radio and television a number of times. Frank Atkinson was the first person to play the role in the 1953 BBC children's television series Worzel Gummidge Turns Detective. Former Doctor Who actor Jon Pertwee took the lead role from 1979 to 1981 in Worzel Gummidge, produced by Southern Television for ITV in the UK. Pertwee reprised the role later in a New Zealand version (1987–1989). For the Pertwee series, the character had a set of interchangeable turnip, mangelwurzel and swede heads, each of which suited a particular occasion or endowed him with a specific skill.

In 2019 the character returned to the screen in the BBC series Worzel Gummidge starring Mackenzie Crook in the titular role.

Outline
Worzel Gummidge is a scarecrow that can come to life on Scatterbrook Farm. Worzel stands in a ten-acre field. He befriended John and Susan who came to stay during the school holidays on the Braithwaites' farm. Worzel normally lands John and Susan in trouble when he is being mischievous, as he goes into a sulk and becomes a normal lifeless scarecrow. This leads others to blame the two children for the trouble he causes.

The Worzel Gummidge books differ from the television adaption, one difference being that in the books Worzel is married to Earthy Mangold. In the first book, Aunt Sally (his femme fatale in the TV series) is only mentioned in one chapter and the character is an antagonistic bully to Worzel. For the television adaptation, Worzel has a collection of interchangeable heads. In the books, the maker of Worzel Gummidge and other scarecrows is not named the Crowman, but is described as a mysterious figure.

Books
 Worzel Gummidge (1936)
 Worzel Gummidge Again (1937)
 More About Worzel Gummidge (1938)
 Worzel Gummidge And Saucy Nancy (1947)
 Worzel Gummidge Takes A Holiday (1949)
 Earthy Mangold And Worzel Gummidge (1954)
 Worzel Gummidge And The Railway Scarecrows (1955)
 Worzel Gummidge At The Circus (1956)
 Worzel Gummidge And The Treasure Ship (1958)
 Detective Worzel Gummidge (1963)

The first paperback version of the first book, released in 1941, has the distinction of being the first story book published by the famous children's imprint Puffin.

Adaptations

Children's Hour

The first broadcast with Worzel was before World War II on the BBC's Children's Hour. By 1946, Worzel was played by veteran radio actor Philip Wade, John by John Clark, Susan by Rosamund Barnes, and Earthy Mangold by Mabel Constanduros. Later, Worzel was played by Denis Folwell, who went on to play Jack Archer in the long-running BBC radio 4 soap opera The Archers.

Worzel Gummidge Turns Detective

The character first appeared on television in 1953 in a four-part series starring Frank Atkinson in the title role.

Jackanory

In July 1967 five Worzel Gummidge stories were read on Jackanory by Gordon Rollings.  Worzel Gummidge Again was read in November 1974 (with one story tying in with Guy Fawkes Night) by Geoffrey Bayldon, later to appear in the 1979-81 TV series.

1979-81 television series

Southern Television's production for ITV was written by Keith Waterhouse and Willis Hall, and starred Jon Pertwee as Worzel, with Una Stubbs as Aunt Sally, a life-size fairground doll and Worzel's femme fatale. This was a significant change from the original books, where Aunt Sally is, in fact, Worzel's aunt. The Crowman, who made Worzel and some of his other scarecrow friends, was played by Geoffrey Bayldon (who read Worzel Gummidge Again in November 1974 on BBC1's Jackanory), better known for his starring role as the title character of Catweazle. Bill Maynard also appeared as a scarecrow called Sergeant Beetroot.

Worzel Gummidge Down Under

Television New Zealand and Channel 4 collaborated on a follow-up programme that ran for two series in 1987 and 1989, with Worzel Gummidge and Aunt Sally, still played by Pertwee and Stubbs, relocated to New Zealand.

Worzel Gummidge (2019 adaptation)

Worzel Gummidge is a 2019 British TV fantasy miniseries, and an adaptation of the Worzel Gummidge series by Barbara Euphan Todd. It stars Mackenzie Crook, who also wrote and directed the series, as the magical scarecrow. It was produced by Leopard Pictures (part of the Argonon Group) and was broadcast by BBC One on 26 and 27 December 2019. A further four episodes followed in 2020 and 2021.

References

Worzel Gummidge
Worzel Gummidge
British novels adapted into television shows
Fictional anthropomorphic characters
Fictional scarecrows
Literary characters introduced in 1936
Male characters in literature
Worzel Gummidge